Douglas McAuthur Goodwin (March 11, 1942) is a former American football running back who played two seasons in the NFL with two different teams. He spent one season with the Buffalo Bills and one season with the Atlanta Falcons of the National Football League. He played college football for the Maryland Eastern Shore Hawks football team. He was drafted by the Green Bay Packers in the 5th round of the 1965 NFL Draft, and drafted by the Buffalo Bills in the eleventh round of the 1965 AFL Draft.

References

1942 births
Living people
Players of American football from  South Carolina
American football running backs
Buffalo Bills players
Atlanta Falcons players
Maryland Eastern Shore Hawks football players